On 5 July 1984, nine hijackers forced Indian Airlines Flight 405, an Airbus A300 on a domestic flight from Srinagar Airport to the Delhi-Palam Airport with 254 passengers and 10 crew on board, to be flown to Lahore Airport in Pakistan.

The Sikh hijackers were armed with guns, daggers and a fake bomb. Their demands included the release of prisoners (all Sikhs arrested during Operation Blue Star),   million for damage done during the Operation, and the return of items alleged to be stolen from the Golden Temple during the Operation. The demands of the hijackers were not met and they ultimately surrendered to Pakistani authorities on July 6.

The Press Trust of India quoted the hijackers as saying "Long Live Khalistan". It was related to the secessionist struggle in the Indian state of Punjab, where Khalistani separatists were active. They demanded a separate country for Sikhs. The Khalistan movement was a separatist movement in Indian Punjab and the United Kingdom where a small portion of the Sikh community openly asked for a different country for Sikh people (Khalistan).

See also 

 List of hijackings of Indian aeroplanes#1980s
 List of aircraft hijackings#1980s
 List of accidents and incidents involving airliners by location#India
 List of accidents and incidents involving airliners by airline (D–O)#I
 List of accidents and incidents involving commercial aircraft#1984

References

External links 

Aviation accidents and incidents in 1984
Aircraft hijackings in Pakistan
Aviation accidents and incidents in the United Arab Emirates
Aircraft hijackings in India
Aviation accidents and incidents in India
Sikh terrorism in India
Terrorist incidents in India in 1984
Hostage taking in India
Indian (airline) accidents and incidents
1984 in India
Accidents and incidents involving the Airbus A300
Indira Gandhi administration
Aircraft hijackings
Terrorist incidents in India
1984 disasters in the United Arab Emirates